The III Games of the Small States of Europe were held in 1989 by the Republic of Cyprus. The majority of events including the opening and closing ceremonies took place at the Makario Stadium, while the indoor events were held at the Lefkotheo.

Competitions

Medal count

Final Table:

References

San Marino Olympic Committee

 
Games of the Small States of Europe
Sport in Nicosia
S
S
1989 in European sport
International sports competitions hosted by Cyprus
Multi-sport events in Cyprus